is a railway station on the Keikyū Main Line in Shinagawa, Tokyo, Japan, operated by Keikyu. It is numbered KK02.

Kitashinagawa Station, meaning "North Shinagawa", is in fact located south of the Shinagawa Station. This is due to the fact that Kitashinagawa refers to its position in Shinagawa-ku, while the confusingly named Shinagawa Station is in neighboring Minato-ku.

Lines

Layout
This station consists of two side platforms serving two tracks.

History
The station opened on 8 May 1904.

Keikyu introduced station numbering to its stations on 21 October 2010; Kitashinagawa was assigned station number KK02.

References

Railway stations in Japan opened in 1904
Railway stations in Tokyo